Hiromi Isozaki may refer to:

Hiromi Isozaki (sprinter) (born 1965), Japanese sprint athlete
Hiromi Isozaki (born 1975), maiden name of Japanese footballer Hiromi Ikeda